James Rains may refer to:
 James E. Rains (1833–1862), Confederate States Army officer who served in Tennessee and Kentucky
 James S. Rains (1817–1880), Missouri State Guard officer who served in Arkansas and Missouri